Dasht-e Sar Rural District was a rural district (dehestan) in Dabudasht District, Amol County, Mazandaran Province, Iran. At the 2006 census, its population was 35,795 in 9,263 families. The rural district has 86 villages. Now Dashte Sar is a district of Amol.

References 

Amol County
Rural Districts of Mazandaran Province